The Third Federal Electoral District of Chihuahua (III Distrito Electoral Federal de Chihuahua) is one of the 300 Electoral Districts into which Mexico is divided for the purpose of elections to the federal Chamber of Deputies and one of nine such districts in the state of Chihuahua.

It elects one deputy to the lower house of Congress for each three-year legislative period, by means of the first past the post system.

District territory
Under the 2005 districting scheme, Chihuahua's Third District covers the eastern portion of Ciudad Juárez.

The district's head town (cabecera distrital), where results from individual polling stations are gathered together and collated, is the city of  Ciudad Juárez.

Previous districting schemes

1996–2005 district
Almost exactly the same as the current configuration.

1979–1996 district
As at present, the Third District covered a portion of the Ciudad Juárez urban area.

Deputies returned to Congress from this district

XLVIII Legislature
 1970–1971:  Mario Jáquez Provencio (PRI)
 1971–1973:  Fernando Pacheco Parra (PRI)
XLIX Legislature
 1973–1976:
L Legislature
 1976–1979:  José Reyes Estrada Aguirre (PRI)
LI Legislature
 1979–1982:  René Franco Barreno (PRI)
LII Legislature
 1982–1985:  Enrique Soto Izquierdo (PRI)
LIII Legislature
 1985–1988:  Héctor Mejía Gutiérrez (PAN)
LIV Legislature
 1988–1991:  Miguel Agustín Corral (PAN)
LV Legislature
 1991–1994:  Carlos Morales Villalobos (PRI)
LVI Legislature
 1994–1997:  Sergio Vázquez Olivas (PRI)
LVII Legislature
 1997–2000:  Saúl Flores Prieto (PAN)
LVIII Legislature
 2000–2003:  Carlos Borunda Zaragoza (PAN)
LIX Legislature
 2003–2006:  María Ávila Serna (PVEM)
LX Legislature
 2006–2009:  Cruz Pérez Cuéllar (PAN)

Results

References

Federal electoral districts of Mexico
Chihuahua (state)